Tres Lomas is a town in Buenos Aires Province, Argentina. It is the head town of the Tres Lomas Partido.

External links

 Municipal website

Populated places in Buenos Aires Province
Populated places established in 1906
1906 establishments in Argentina